Saint Philip Parish may refer to:
Saint Philip Parish, Antigua and Barbuda
Saint Philip Parish, Barbados

Civil parishes in the Caribbean
Parish name disambiguation pages